The Republic of Cyprus is a unitary presidential representative republic, whereby the President of Cyprus is both head of state and head of government. Executive power is exercised by the government. Legislative power is vested in both the government and the parliament. The Judiciary is independent of the executive and the legislature.

Cyprus has been a divided island since 1974 when Turkey invaded to support Turkish Cypriots in response to a military coup on the island which was backed by the Athens government.  Since then, the internationally recognized Republic of Cyprus has controlled the south two-thirds, and the Turkish Republic of Northern Cyprus, only recognized by Turkey, the northern one-third. The Government of the Republic of Cyprus has continued as the sole internationally recognized authority on the island (as well as the United Kingdom being internationally recognized with respect to the SBAs), though in practice its power extends only to the government-controlled area.

Cyprus operates under a multi-party system, with communist AKEL and right-leaning Democratic Rally in the forefront. Centrist DIKO and lesser parties often form a coalition with the President's party and are allotted a number of ministries.

United Cyprus
The 1960 Cypriot Constitution provided for a presidential system of government with independent executive, legislative, and judicial branches, as well as a complex system of checks and balances including a weighted power-sharing ratio designed to protect the interests of the Turkish Cypriots. The executive, for example, was headed by a Greek Cypriot president, Archbishop Makarios III, and a Turkish Cypriot vice president, Dr Fazıl Küçük, elected by their respective communities for 5-year terms and each possessing a right of veto over certain types of legislation and executive decisions.

The House of Representatives was elected on the basis of separate voters' rolls. Since 1964, following clashes between the two communities, the Turkish Cypriot seats in the House remained vacant, while the Greek Cypriot Communal Chamber was abolished. The responsibilities of the chamber were transferred to the newfounded Ministry of Education.

By 1967, when a military junta had seized power in Greece, the political impetus for enosis had faded, partly as a result of the non-aligned foreign policy of Cypriot President Makarios. Enosis remained an ideological goal, despite being pushed significantly further down the political agenda. Dissatisfaction in Greece with Makarios convinced the Greek colonels to sponsor the 1974 coup in Nicosia.

Turkey responded by launching a military operation on Cyprus in a move not approved by the other two international guarantor powers, Greece and the United Kingdom, claiming that this was for the protection of the Turkish minority from Greek militias. The invasion is called "Cyprus Peace Operation" by the Turkish side. Turkish forces captured the northern part of the island. Many thousands of others, from both sides, left the island entirely. In addition to many of the Greek Cypriot refugees (a third of the population), many Turkish Cypriots also moved to the UK.

Subsequently, the Turkish Cypriots established their own separatist institutions with a popularly elected de facto President and a Prime Minister responsible to the National Assembly exercising joint executive powers. In 1983, the Turkish Cypriots declared an independent state called the Turkish Republic of Northern Cyprus (TRNC), an action opposed by the United Nations Security Council. In 1985, the TRNC adopted a constitution and held its first elections.

Division of Cyprus

In 1974, following a coup sponsored by the Greek military junta of 1967-1974 and executed by the Cypriot National Guard the invasion of troops from Turkey (citing its authority as one of the three guarantor powers established by the Constitution), the Turkish Cypriots formally set up their own institutions with a popularly elected president and a prime minister, responsible to the National Assembly, exercising joint executive powers.  Cyprus has been divided, de facto, into the Greek Cypriot controlled southern two-thirds of the island and the Turkish Republic of Northern Cyprus a third.  The Republic of Cyprus is the internationally recognised government of the Republic of Cyprus, that controls the southern two-thirds of the island. Aside from Turkey, all foreign governments and the United Nations recognise the sovereignty of the Republic of Cyprus over the whole island of Cyprus.

Turkey, which does not recognise the Republic of Cyprus, and the Turkish Cypriot administration of the northern part of the island, do not accept the Republic's rule over the whole island and refer to it not by its international name, but as the "Greek Cypriot Administration of Southern Cyprus". Its territory, a result of the Turkish invasion of 1974 and whose status remains disputed, extends over the northern third of the island.

The north proclaimed its independence in 1975. In 1983, the Turkish Cypriots declared an independent "Turkish Republic of Northern Cyprus", which has never been recognized by any country except Turkey.  In 1985, they adopted a constitution and held elections—an arrangement recognized only by Turkey.  For information pertaining to this, see Politics of the Turkish Republic of Northern Cyprus. The Organisation of the Islamic Conference (now the Organisation of Islamic Cooperation) granted it observer member status under the name of "Turkish Cypriot State".

Political conditions

The division of Cyprus has remained an intractable political problem plaguing relations between Greece and Turkey, and drawing in NATO, of which both Greece and Turkey are members, and latterly the European Union, which has admitted Greece and Cyprus and which Turkey has been seeking to join for over twenty years.

The most recent developments on the island have included the reopening of the border between the two sides, and the failure of an attempt to reunify the island under the terms of a United Nations-sponsored initiative guided by the UN Secretary-General, Kofi Annan.

None of the Greek Cypriot parties has been able to elect a president by itself or dominate the 56-seat House of Representatives. The 165,000 Greek Cypriot refugees are also a potent political force, along with the independent Orthodox Church of Cyprus, which has some influence in temporal as well as ecclesiastical matters.

The working of the Cypriot state was fraught with difficulty from the very early days after independence in 1960, and intercommunal tension and occasionally violence was a feature of the first decade of Cypriot independence. In 1963, the Cypriot president, Makarios, proposed 13 amendments to the Constitution in order to “remove obstacles to the smooth functioning and development of the state.” This was done with the encouragement of the British High Commissioner in Cyprus, who considered the amendments “a reasonable basis for discussion.” Violence erupted between Greek and Turkish Cypriots in December 1963 and by the following year the United Nations agreed to undertake peacekeeping operations UNFICYP.

UN-sponsored negotiations to develop institutional arrangements acceptable to the Greek Cypriot and Turkish Cypriot communities began in 1968; several sets of negotiations and other initiatives followed.

After the 1974 invasion following a Greek junta-based coup attempt, Makarios secured international recognition of his Greek Cypriot government as the sole legal authority on Cyprus, which has proved to be a very significant strategic advantage for the Greek Cypriots in the decades since. Negotiations continued in the years after 1974 with varying degrees of regularity and success, but none resulted in a full reunification. 
On 15 November 1983 the Turkish Cypriot North declared independence and the formation of the Turkish Republic of Northern Cyprus (TRNC), which has been recognized only by Turkey. Both sides publicly call for the resolution of intercommunal differences and creation of a new federal system of government.

Following the 1998 presidential election, Klerides tried to form a government of national unity, by including six ministers from Klerides' Democratic Rally party, two ministers from the socialist EDEK, three from the Democratic Party (who broke ranks with party leader Spyros Kyprianou) and one from the United Democrats. However, a national unity government was not achieved due to the leftist AKEL and centrist Democratic Party rejecting the offer, preferring to remain opposition parties.

Reunification, the Annan Plan and EU entry
The results of early negotiations between the Greek Cypriot and Turkish Cypriot politicians resulted in a broad agreement in principle to reunification as a bicameral, bi-zonal federation with territory allocated to the Greek and Turkish Cypriot communities within a united island. However, agreement was never reached on the finer details, and the two sides often met deadlock over the following points, among others:

The Greek Cypriot side:
 took a strong line on the right of return for refugees to properties vacated in the 1974 displacement of Cypriots on both sides, which was based on both UN Resolutions and decisions of the European Court of Human Rights;
 took a dim view of any proposals which did not allow for the repatriation of Turkish settlers from the mainland who had emigrated to Cyprus since 1974; and
 supported a stronger central government.

The Turkish Cypriot side:
 favoured a weak central government presiding over two sovereign states in voluntary association, a legacy of earlier fears of domination by the majority Greek Cypriots; and
 opposed plans for demilitarisation, citing security concerns.

The continued difficulties in finding a settlement presented a potential obstacle to Cypriot entry to the European Union, for which the government had applied in 1997. UN-sponsored talks between the Greek and Turkish Cypriot leaders, Glafkos Klerides and Rauf Denktaş, continued intensively in 2002, but without resolution. In December 2002, the EU formally invited Cyprus to join in 2004, insisting that EU membership would apply to the whole island and hoping that it would provide a significant enticement for reunification resulting from the outcome of ongoing talks. However, weeks before the UN deadline, Klerides was defeated in presidential elections by centre candidate Tassos Papadopoulos. Papadopoulos had a reputation as a hard-liner on reunification and based his stance on international law and human rights. By mid-March, the UN declared that the talks had failed.

A United Nations plan sponsored by Secretary-General Kofi Annan was announced on 31 March 2004, based on what progress had been made during the talks in Switzerland and fleshed out by the UN, was put for the first time to civilians on both sides in separate referendums on 24 April 2004. The Greek side overwhelmingly rejected the Annan Plan, and the Turkish side voted in favour.

In May 2004, Cyprus entered the EU, still divided, although in practice membership only applies to the southern part of the island which is in the control of the Republic of Cyprus. In acknowledgment of the Turkish Cypriot community's support for reunification, however, the EU made it clear that trade concessions would be reached to stimulate economic growth in the north, and remains committed to reunification under acceptable terms. Though some trade restrictions were lifted on the north to alleviate economic isolation for the Turkish Cypriots, further negotiations have not been a priority. There is now a focus on convincing Turkey to recognise the government of Cyprus, a requirement for Turkish admission advocated most strongly by Cyprus and France.

Constitution
The 16 August 1960 constitution envisioned power sharing between the Greek Cypriots and Turkish Cypriots.  Efforts to amends the constitution sparked the intercommunal strife in 1963.  This constitution is still in force, though there is no Turkish Cypriot presence in the Cypriot government.

Executive branch

|President
|Nikos Christodoulides
|Independent
|28 February 2023
|}
The president, elected by popular vote for a five-year term, is both the chief of state and head of government; post of vice president is currently vacant; under the 1960 constitution, the post is reserved for a Turkish Cypriot. The Council of Ministers is appointed jointly by the president and vice president.

Currently there are eleven ministries and five deputy ministries. 

Ministries: 
Ministry of Agriculture, Rural Development and the Environment. Minister: Petros Xenophontos
Ministry of Energy, Commerce and Industry. Minister: Giorgos Papanastasiou
Ministry of Transport, Communications and Works. Minister: Alexis Vafiades
Ministry of Defence. Minister: Michalis Georgallas
Ministry of Education, Sport and Youth. Minister: Dr Athena Michaelidou
Ministry of Finance. Minister: Makis Keravnos
Ministry of Foreign Affairs. Minister: Constantinos Kombos
Ministry of Health. Minister: Popi Kanari
Ministry of the Interior. Minister: Constantinos Ioannou
Ministry of Justice and Public Order. Minister: Anna Prokopiou
Ministry of Labour and Social Insurance: Yiannis Panayiotou
Deputy Ministries:

 Deputy Ministry of Shipping. Deputy Minister: Marina Hadjimanoli
 Deputy Ministry of Tourism. Deputy Minister: Costas Koumis
 Deputy Ministry of Research, Innovation and Digital Policy. Deputy Minister: Philippos Hadjizacharias
 Deputy Ministry of Social Welfare. Deputy Minister: Marilena Evangelou
 Deputy Ministry of Culture. Deputy Minister: Michalis Hatzigiannis

Legislative branch
The House of Representatives (Vouli Antiprosópon/Temsilciler Meclisi) has 59 members elected for a five-year term: 56 Greek Cypriot members chosen by proportional representation and 3 observer members representing the Maronite, Latin Catholic and Armenian minorities. 24 seats are allocated to the Turkish community, but are currently vacant.

Political parties and elections

Latest elections

President

Parliament

Political pressure groups and leaders
 Cypriot Workers Union (Σ.Ε.Κ. Συνομοσπονδία Εργατών Κύπρου)
 Union of Cypriots (Ένωσις Κυπρίων - Kıbrıslılar Birliği)
 Revolutionary Trade Unions Federation (DEV-İŞ) 
 Pan-Cyprian Labour Federation or PEO (Π.Ε.Ο. Παγκύπρια Εργατική Ομοσπονδία)
 Eleftheria Citizens Initiative (Πρωτοβουλία Πολιτών Ελευθερία)

Administrative divisions
6 districts; Famagusta (Ammochostos), Kyrenia, Larnaca, Limassol (Lemesos), Nicosia (Lefkosia), Paphos; note - occupied area's administrative divisions include Kyrenia, all but a small part of Famagusta (Ammochostos), and small parts of Lefkosia (Nicosia) and Larnaca.

Exclaves and enclaves
Cyprus has four exclaves, all in territory that belongs to the British Sovereign Base Area of Dhekelia. The first two are the villages of Ormidhia and Xylotymvou. Additionally there is the Dhekelia Power Station, which is divided by a British road into two parts. The northern part is an enclave, like the two villages, whereas the southern part is located by the sea and therefore not an enclave —although it has no territorial waters of its own.

The UN buffer zone separating the territory controlled by the Turkish Cypriot administration from the rest of Cyprus runs up against Dhekelia and picks up again from its east side, off of Ayios Nikolaos (connected to the rest of Dhekelia by a thin land corridor). In that sense, the buffer zone turns the south-east corner of the island, the Paralimni area, into a de facto, though not de jure, exclave.

See also
Cyprus
Turkish Republic of Northern Cyprus
List of Minister of Communications and Works of the Republic of Cyprus
List of Minister of Labour and Social Insurance of the Republic of Cyprus

Notes

References

Further reading

External links

Cyprus Elections by KyproEkloges.com

 
Government of Cyprus

bn:সাইপ্রাস#রাজনীতি